The Nikkan Sports Film Award for Best Actor is an award given at the Nikkan Sports Film Award.

List of winners

References

External links
  
Nikkan Sports Film Awards on IMDb

Awards established in 1988
Japanese film awards
Recurring events established in 1988
1988 establishments in Japan
Nikkan Sports Film Award
Lists of films by award
Film awards for lead actor